Udhiaguri is a small village near Salbari in Baksa district in the Indian state of Assam.

Villages in Baksa district